Birgit Ellenora Johanne Dalland (5 February 1907 – 30 May 2007) was a Norwegian politician for the Communist Party.

She served as a deputy representative to the Norwegian Parliament from Bergen during the term 1945–1949.

References

1907 births
2007 deaths
Norwegian communists
Communist Party of Norway politicians
Deputy members of the Storting
Politicians from Bergen
Women members of the Storting
Norwegian centenarians
Women centenarians